Tjentište is a village and a valley in the municipality of Foča, Republika Srpska, Bosnia and Herzegovina. It lies entirely within Sutjeska National Park.

History 

The village was known for the war memorials commemorating the 1943 Battle of the Sutjeska (Operation Fall Schwarz); the Valley of Heroes (1971) by Miodrag Živković and the concrete Memorial House by Ranko Radović, which contains unfinished frescoes by famed Croatian artist Krsto Hegedušić.

References

Villages in Republika Srpska
Populated places in Foča